Tibo Persyn (born 13 March 2002) is a Belgian professional footballer who plays as a midfielder for Eerste Divisie club FC Eindhoven, on loan from Inter Milan.

Club career

Inter Milan
Having joined the youth academy of Club Brugge in 2012, Persyn signed for Inter Milan in summer 2018, aged 16.

Loans to Club Brugge and Westerlo
In July 2021, he returned to Club Brugge of the Belgian First Division A on a season-long loan with the option to make the loan permanent. He made his professional debut on 15 August 2021, coming on as an 87th-minute substitute for Clinton Mata in a 4–0 league win against Zulte Waregem. Persyn's first goal for the club came on 22 August 2021 in the 55th minute of a 3–2 win against Beerschot.

On 27 January 2022, Brugge and Westerlo agreed that Persyn will join Westerlo until the end of the season.

Loan to FC Eindhoven
On 22 July 2022, Persyn joined Eerste Divisie club FC Eindhoven on a season-long loan.

International career
Persyn has represented Belgium at under-15, under-17, under-18 and under-19 levels. He made 3 appearances for Belgium at the 2018 UEFA European Under-17 Championship and 4 appearances at the 2019 UEFA European Under-17 Championship.

Career statistics

Honours 
Westerlo

 Belgian First Division B: 2021–22

References

External links

2002 births
Living people
Belgian footballers
Association football midfielders
Club Brugge KV players
Inter Milan players
K.V.C. Westerlo players
FC Eindhoven players
Belgian Pro League players
Challenger Pro League players
Belgium youth international footballers
Belgian expatriate footballers
Belgian expatriate sportspeople in Italy
Expatriate footballers in Italy
Belgian expatriate sportspeople in the Netherlands
Expatriate footballers in the Netherlands